Rhogeessa is a genus of bats within the vesper bats family, Vespertilionidae.

Species
Yucatan yellow bat (R. aeneus)
Allen's yellow bat (R. alleni)
Bickham's little yellow bat (Rhogeessa bickhami)
Genoways's yellow bat (R. genowaysi)
Slender yellow bat (R. gracilis)
Husson's yellow bat (R. hussoni)
Thomas's yellow bat (R. io)
Menchu's little yellow bat (R. menchuae)
Tiny yellow bat (R. minutilla)
Least yellow bat (R. mira)
Little yellow bat (R. parvula)
Black-winged little yellow bat (R. tumida)
Ecuadorian little yellow bat (R. velilla)

Taxonomy debate
This genus is systematically complex and sometimes controversial. One reason that the genus is complex is because of the species' variable karyotypes:

*Note that R. tumida is listed four times, as individuals have been found with four different karyotypes. This may represent a species complex.

Some have placed Allen's yellow bat into its own genus, Baeodon based on its differences with other members of the genus.
However, others argue that as Allen's yellow bat and the slender yellow bat are sister taxa, to exclude only one from Rhogeessa makes it a paraphyletic group. By that logic, either both species need to be included in Rhogeessa, or both need to be placed in Baeodon. A 2008 paper recommended moving the slender yellow bat to the Baeodon genus. 
Others say that Baeodon should be recognized as a subgenus of Rhogeessa instead of as a separate genus.

References

 
Bat genera
Bats of North America
Bats of South America
Taxa named by Harrison Allen